Broomfield is a village and civil parish in the Sedgemoor district of Somerset, England, situated about five miles north of Taunton.  According to the 2011 census it had a population of 249.

The village is the highest village on the Quantock Hills and lies on the Quantock Greenway footpath.

History

Approximately  from the village is the Iron Age hill fort of Ruborough Camp.
There was a tunnel, which has now been filled in, which gave the camp safe access to a nearby spring for water.

The estate was owned after the Norman Conquest by William de Mohun of Dunster, 1st Earl of Somerset.

Broomfield was part of the hundred of Andersfield.

Governance

The parish council has responsibility for local issues, including setting an annual precept (local rate) to cover the council's operating costs and producing annual accounts for public scrutiny. The parish council evaluates local planning applications and works with the local police, district council officers, and neighbourhood watch groups on matters of crime, security, and traffic. The parish council's role also includes initiating projects for the maintenance and repair of parish facilities, as well as consulting with the district council on the maintenance, repair, and improvement of highways, drainage, footpaths, public transport, and street cleaning. Conservation matters (including trees and listed buildings) and environmental issues are also the responsibility of the council.

The village falls within the Non-metropolitan district of Sedgemoor, which was formed on 1 April 1974 under the Local Government Act 1972, having previously been part of Bridgwater Rural District, which is responsible for local planning and building control, local roads, council housing, environmental health, markets and fairs, refuse collection and recycling, cemeteries and crematoria, leisure services, parks, and tourism.

Somerset County Council is responsible for running the largest and most expensive local services such as education, social services, libraries, main roads, public transport, policing and fire services, trading standards, waste disposal and strategic planning.

It is also part of the Bridgwater and West Somerset county constituency represented in the House of Commons of the Parliament of the United Kingdom. It elects one Member of Parliament (MP) by the first past the post system of election. It was part of the South West England constituency of the European Parliament prior to Britain leaving the European Union in January 2020, which elected seven MEPs using the d'Hondt method of party-list proportional representation.

International Music Concerts

Since 2008 the village has been home to a series of international concerts including classical music, jazz, indie, folk and performance poetry. 

Events are held in barns, a large marquee, the parish church and village hall.

The concerts, known as Music on the Quantocks, have attracted some of the world's finest musicians including flautist Sir James Galway, the legendary guitarist John Williams, the European Union Orchestra, and choral groups the Hilliard Ensemble and The Sixteen.

Over 250 events have taken place. Each was sold out. Concerts are rarely advertised. News about them is available only via a mailing list.

Concerts resumed in June 2021 following a 15-month suspension due to the Coronavirus pandemic.

Church 
The Church of St. Mary and All Saints was built in the 15th and 16th centuries. The church contains the laboratory table of Andrew Crosse, on which he carried out electrical experiments and an obelisk in his memory is in the churchyard.

Fyne Court 

Fyne Court is now a National Trust-owned nature reserve and visitor centre. The Quantock Hills AONB and Somerset Wildlife Trust have their headquarters at the house. Originally the house pleasure grounds of the 19th-century amateur scientist and electrical pioneer, Andrew Crosse, whose family had owned the house from its construction. It burnt down in 1898. His laboratory table on which he carried out experiments stands in the aisle of the Church of St. Mary and All Saints in Broomfield and an obelisk in his memory is in the churchyard.

Notable residents

 The politician Lord Rippon of Hexham lived in the village and is buried in the churchyard.
 The Clash vocalist Joe Strummer died from a heart attack at his home there in December 2002.
 The cricketer Alfred Bowerman was born in the village.

References

External links

Villages in Sedgemoor
Civil parishes in Somerset